Derek St. Holmes (born February 24, 1953) is an American rock musician, best known as the lead singer and rhythm guitar player for Ted Nugent's early solo career. After splitting from Nugent in 1978, St. Holmes worked with various artists, most notably the Whitford/St. Holmes project with Brad Whitford, who had then recently parted ways with Aerosmith. He has also reunited with Nugent on several occasions.

Career
St. Holmes was born and raised in Riverview, Michigan, a suburb of Detroit. He received his first guitar for his eleventh birthday. He started his own neighborhood band, The Organized Confusion, and also played for high school dances.

1970s
St. Holmes started the three-piece band Scott in 1972, for which he was lead guitarist, vocalist and songwriter. In 1974, Scott opened for an Amboy Dukes show at the Lincoln Park Theater. The Amboy Dukes and their guitar player Ted Nugent had already recorded several albums and were a staple of the Midwest rock scene at the time. When the Amboy Dukes broke up, Nugent's road manager (Phil Nicholson) contacted St. Holmes about auditioning as lead singer for Nugent's new solo project.

St. Holmes joined Ted Nugent, former Amboy Dukes bassist Rob Grange and drummer Cliff Davies to release Nugent's self-titled debut album in 1975. He is the lead vocalist on the three most popular recordings from the debut album: "Hey Baby" (also composed by St. Holmes), "Stranglehold" and "Just What the Doctor Ordered". St. Holmes briefly left Nugent in mid-1976, citing personal, financial and musical differences. He returned in time to contribute to several songs on Nugent's sophomore effort Free-for-All, including lead vocals on "Dog Eat Dog", but by that time several of the album's songs had already been recorded with Meat Loaf providing lead vocals. St. Holmes remained in Nugent's band for the 1977 album Cat Scratch Fever and its subsequent tour which produced the 1978 Double Live Gonzo! album. He and Nugent then parted ways, as their differences continued to grow.

In 1979, St. Holmes joined up with Ted Nugent's bass player Rob Grange and ex-Montrose drummer Denny Carmassi to form St. Paradise. They released one self-titled album for Warner Brothers in 1979 before moving on to other musical projects.

1980s
In 1981, St. Holmes teamed up with Aerosmith guitarist Brad Whitford for the short-lived Whitford/St. Holmes band. As with St. Paradise, Whitford/St. Holmes released only one self-titled album before splitting.

After a four-album absence, St. Holmes reappeared in Ted Nugent's studio band for the 1982 album Nugent, singing lead on six of the album's ten tracks.

In 1983, St. Holmes contributed vocals to one song on the Michael Schenker Group release Built to Destroy, and also appeared on the live follow-up, Rock Will Never Die. However, frequent long trips to England and Europe had St. Holmes wanting to return home to the US, where he had a wife and newborn child, and he departed MSG amicably.

1990s
In 1995, St. Holmes reunited with Ted Nugent for the latter's Spirit of the Wild album, on which St. Holmes co-wrote seven songs and sang lead on six. 

After another departure from Nugent, St. Holmes co-founded the supergroup Big People in 1999, which also included guitarist Pat Travers, bassist/vocalist Benjamin Orr (The Cars), guitarist/vocalist Jeff Carlisi (.38 Special) and drummer Liberty DeVitto (Billy Joel). The band performed live, covering songs from each artist's past groups, but did not put out an album, as Orr died in 2000 and the group did not want to continue with a replacement.

Later career
In 2000, St. Holmes released his first solo album Then and Now, a collection of his own rock material. Bassist Chase Chitty (Pat Travers Band), drummer Steve Pace (Hydra, Krokus, Whitford/St. Holmes) and keyboardist Russ Still accompany St. Holmes with songs such as "Standing in the Rain", "Dr. Love" and "Surrounded", and the energy rocker "In Too Deep".

On July 4, 2008, St. Holmes made a guest appearance at Ted Nugent's 6,000th concert in Detroit. He jammed on "Hey Baby", "Cat Scratch Fever", and "Stranglehold" with Nugent. On August 24, 2008, he joined Nugent on stage at Capital One Bank Theatre at Westbury in Westbury, New York. He sang and played guitar with Nugent on "Hey Baby", "Just What the Doctor Ordered", "Dog Eat Dog", "Stormtroopin", "Cat Scratch Fever" and "Stranglehold".

St. Holmes re-recorded some famous Aerosmith songs for a special promotion and made them available in MP3 format on his website.

St. Holmes sang in the Paul Reed Smith Band, co-writing songs such as "One in the Same" and "Ice Cold Kisses". The self-titled CD was released in June 2010, with a second album, Time to Testify released in February 2017.

On December 27, 2008, St. Holmes was a special guest at a Get the Led Out concert at Ram's Head Live in Baltimore, Maryland. He played guitar for "Rock and Roll", then sang and played "Stranglehold" (Ted Nugent). St. Holmes is actually the voice heard in the track recording. He also performed "Stranglehold" with Get the Led Out at the Nokia in New York City in March 2009 and again in Baltimore in May 2010.

In 2010, St. Holmes participated in a tribute album titled Mister Bolin's Late Night Revival, a compilation of 17 previously unreleased tracks written by guitar legend Tommy Bolin prior to his death in 1976. The CD includes other artists such as HiFi Superstar, Doogie White, Eric Martin, Troy Luccketta, Jeff Pilson, Randy Jackson, Rachel Barton, Rex Carroll, Kimberley Dahme, and The 77's. A percentage of the proceeds from this project will benefit the Jackson Recovery Centers.

He toured again with Nugent from 2011 to 2014 and appeared on Nugent's 2014 album Shutup & Jam! Whitford/St. Holmes reunited for a 2015 tour and the follow-up CD Reunion was sold at these shows.

Also in 2014, St. Holmes announced that Gibson would release a signature guitar in his name later in the year. The guitar is a white Gibson SG custom with an ebony fingerboard and three humbucker pickups. The guitar is fitted with a vibrola.

St. Holmes performed at the 2015 Dick Wagner Memorial "Remember the Child" benefit concert in Detroit, and he co-headlined the same event in 2016 with Brad Whitford and The Frost.

In 2017, St. Holmes surprised and delighted fans by joining an REO Speedwagon performance for an impromptu rendition of Stranglehold during the annual NAHA(Native American Heritage Assoc) benefit Rock Legends Cruise. 

St. Holmes is known for playing a variety of guitars throughout his career, including Fender Stratocasters, Gibson Les Pauls, PRS Guitars, and various Gibson hollow-bodies.

Discography

Main albums with Ted Nugent
1975 
Ted Nugent Ted Nugent
(Epic Records)
 
1976
Ted Nugent Free-for-All
(Epic Records)

1977
Ted Nugent
Cat Scratch Fever
(Epic Records)

1978
Ted Nugent
Double Live Gonzo!
(Epic Records)

1982
Ted Nugent
Nugent (Atlantic Records)
 
1995
Ted Nugent
Spirit of the Wild
(Atlantic Records)

2014
Ted Nugent
Shutup & Jam!
(Frontiers Records)

Main albums – Others
1979
St. Paradise
St. Paradise
(Warner Bros. Records)

1981
Whitford/St. Holmes
Whitford/St. Holmes
(CBS Records)

1991
Vanilla Fudge
The Best of Vanilla Fudge Live
(Rhino Records)

2000
Derek St. Holmes
Then & Now
(Perris Records)

2009
Blood of the Sun
Death Ride
(Brainticket Records)

2011
The Paul Reed Smith Band
(Cargo Records)

2015 
Derek St. Holmes Band Derek St. Holmes Band
(Bentnote Music)

2016
Whitford/St. Holmes
Reunion

Contributions
1983
Michael Schenker Group
Built to Destroy
(Chrysalis Records)
(contributed vocals on the US mix of Still Love That Little Devil)

1984
Michael Schenker Group
Rock Will Never Die
(Chrysalis Records)
(Rhythm guitar, backing vocals, co-lead vocals on "I'm Gonna Make You Mine" and "Rock You to the Ground")

1989
Nightmare Beach
Movie Soundtrack

1994
Dazed and Confused
Movie Soundtrack
(MCA Pictures)

1996
Steve Fister
Shadow King
(FTP Records) (contributed vocals on 3 songs)

1997
Private Parts
Movie Soundtrack
(Paramount/WB)

1999
That '70s Show/Rockin
TV Sitcom Soundtrack
(Volcano Records)

2001
Various Artists
Welcome to the Aerosmithsonian: A Tribute to Aerosmith
(Perris Records)

2010
Mister Bolin's Late Night Revival
What If ...
(Rainbow Foundation Music Inc.) (contributed vocals on 1 song)

Compilations
1981
Ted Nugent
Great Gonzos
(Epic Records)

References

External links
 

1953 births
Living people
American rock singers
American rock guitarists
American male guitarists
20th-century American guitarists
Michael Schenker Group members
Ted Nugent Band members
20th-century American male musicians